In structural engineering and construction, an eyebar is a straight bar, usually of metal, with a hole ("eye") at each end for fixing to other components. Eyebars are used in structures such as bridges, in settings in which only tension, and never compression, is applied. Also referred to as "pin - and eyebar construction" in instances where pins are being used.

Structure

A closed eyebar will typically have a rectangular cross section of constant thickness throughout its length and a constant width for all but the ends. The ends will transition to a wider part that is terminated by a rounded end. In the center of this end will be a hole which will receive a cylindrical pin, which may have provision to accept one or more nuts or bolts. If of round cross section the bar will typically be end-forged to create a head, which is then flatted by additional forging. The head may then be machined to a precise thickness and flatness. An alternative method for using round bar is to form a loop and to forge-weld (hammer weld) or electrically weld the free end to the main bar.

Open eyebars are not used in the cable anchorages of modern wire-cable suspension bridges. This does not allow the wires to be looped over the eye, rather than requiring threading through a closed eye.

Application
The bars may be fabricated with pin holes that are slightly undersized. If so, these are then reamed in the field. This field reaming ensures that stresses will be uniformly distributed among the several bars forming the truss element or the chain link. Corrosion resistant treatment in the form of grease, white or red lead oil paste, or other water-excluding material may be added at the time of the assembly.

Trusses: roofs and buildings 

Eyebars are used in portions of pin-jointed trusses where it can be established by engineering procedures that the bar will not be imposed with any stress other than tension under all expected conditions. Eyebars are used to supplement roof truss framing supports made of wood or metal. They are placed as the struts for the truss, located next to the king joist.

Chain link suspension spans
Eyebar links have long been used in suspension bridges with a number of eyebar links combed together to form a highly redundant structure. This use of eyebar places it in a chain linkage that is holding a load based on tension rather than compression. However, more modern low-redundancy chain link suspension spans fell into general disfavor as a result of the collapse of the Silver Bridge in 1967, which led to the deaths of 46 people.

(The current method of suspension bridge design is to use multiple strands of drawn wire to form substantial cables.)

Fabrication
Eyebars may be cast, forged, or cut from rolled plate. If round stock is used the eyes will usually be forged. Heat treatment (heating and rapid cooling) will result in a fine-grained microscopic crystal structure, enhancing the strength of the bar. Excessive hardness may induce brittleness, which should be avoided. The pins used to join bars will also be heat treated, usually to a degree of hardness exceeding that of the bars so that they will not shear under high stress.

Piling 
Original eyebars were formed from "piling" thin iron metal on top of one another and forging it together in a furnace. Once together the piece  was heated and hammered into a U shape over a die. To create the eye the heated bent iron was hammered into itself closing the gap and creating the eye shape. This method created a quick and efficient way to create the bar, however would not structurally stay together after a certain point due to the piling method being ill heated or being defective.

Casting 
Piling was superseded by casting, wherein the eye and the bar are cast together in the same mold, creating a more sound piece with less area for the bond to break apart. 

Newer methods of steel cutting such as laser / plasma / and water-jetting allow the production of steel items such as eyebars from prefabricated steel plates:

Laser 
A strong laser is used to accurately cut a programmed design from steel. This method is quick and reduces waste, but also requires additional sanding and finishing before use.

Plasma 
Oxygen gas is funneled past an electrode creates an arc, which can be channeled down into steel allowing the metal to be cut. This method for cutting only works on conductive metals.

Water-jet 
Similar to the laser, water-jet cutting utilizes a cutting machine but uses for the force of water to cut through the steel. Using water creates smoothed near finished cuts lowering production time.

Advantages of use
Eyebars were created during the early 1900s where the cost of steel was high. The creation of the eyebar provided a simple solution to lessening the amount of steel needed in a bridge. Using a pin and eye method less stress would theoretically be placed on the joining members.

Problems in use 
Issues occur for the following reasons:

Improper fabrication 
A bar may not be made properly due to bad casting, if steel, or not being hammered properly, if iron. This error is evident in points where the head has snapped off from the bar or the head has cracked across from a pin hole to the exterior side.

Insufficient layering 
Eye bars when placed as supports in bridges are not layered enough. Consider the catastrophe of Silver Bridge, this was an instance where only 2 eyebars were paired together as supports in the chain. It was more common practice to use 4 eye bars pinned together in the instance where one eyebar failed 3 more would be able to split the load rather than just the single eyebar left. In the case of Silver bridge the remaining eye bar also broke which caused the bridge to collapse.

General wear 
Like all metal, steel wears down over time. As a result, the steel pins in the eyes become loose and lose tension, which in turn compromises the integrity of the structure.

Review of eyebar use 
Due to the technological advancements in creating eyebars Iron and old cast method of Steel eyebars are less common. These older bridges however still need to be maintained and reviewed. Researchers like Dewey Walls, Jr. of the Union Pacific Rail Road have compiled resources on how to review, identify compromised locations and how to properly repair the area.

Notable suspension bridges documented by HAER

See also 

 List of bridges documented by the Historic American Engineering Record in Pennsylvania

References

External links 
 Casting In Iron - 1940-1949 - British Instructional Film

Structural system